Virginia Wetherell (born 9 May 1943 in Farnham, Surrey) is an English actress known for her roles in Hammer horror films such as Dr. Jekyll and Sister Hyde (1971) and Demons of the Mind (1972).

Her other film appearances include The Big Switch (1968), Curse of the Crimson Altar (1968), The Other People (1968), Man of Violence (1969), Stanley Kubrick's A Clockwork Orange (1971), Disciple of Death (1972), and the TV film Dracula (1974).

On television, she was a regular cast member in The Troubleshooters as Julie Serres, and played Dyoni in the Doctor Who serial The Daleks.

Wetherell was married to actor Ralph Bates from 1973 until his death from cancer in 1991.

Filmography

Film

Television

References

External links

1943 births
20th-century English actresses
Actresses from Surrey
English film actresses
English television actresses
Living people
People from Farnham